Rachel Margaretha van Dantzig (1878–1949) was a Dutch sculptor.

Biography
Van Dantzig was born on 12 November 1878 in Rotterdam. She studied at the Academie voor Beeldende Kunsten (Rotterdam) and the Académie Colarossi (Paris). She was a student of Charles van der Stappen. She exhibited her work from 1903 through 1939.

In 1913 she won the 1st class medal at the exhibition De Vrouw 1813-1913 with a sculpture. In 1919 she created a medal for victims of the Jewish Pogroms in Eastern Europe. Van Dantzig's work was included in the 1939 exhibition and sale Onze Kunst van Heden (Our Art of Today) at the Rijksmuseum in Amsterdam.

Van Dantzig died on 15 February 1949  in Auderghem, Belgium.

References

External links

images of van Dantzig's work on RKD

1878 births
1949 deaths
Artists from Rotterdam
19th-century Dutch sculptors
20th-century Dutch sculptors
20th-century Dutch women artists
Dutch emigrants to Belgium
Willem de Kooning Academy alumni
Académie Colarossi alumni
Dutch women sculptors